The 21st Annual American Music Awards were held on February 7, 1994, at the Shrine Auditorium, in Los Angeles, California. The awards recognized the most popular artists and albums from the year 1993.

Whitney Houston was the big winner of the night, winning seven out of the eight awards she was nominated for. She also won the Award of Merit that night.

Performances

Winners and nominees

References
 http://www.rockonthenet.com/archive/1994/amas.htm

1994